Prostitution in Northern Ireland is governed by the Human Trafficking and Exploitation (Criminal Justice and Support for Victims) Act (Northern Ireland) 2015, which makes it illegal to pay for sex in Northern Ireland. Prior to the act coming into effect, prostitution in Northern Ireland was regulated by the same or similar laws to those in England and Wales, as it is elsewhere in the United Kingdom. At that time, prostitution in Northern Ireland was legal subject to a number of restraints which controlled certain activities associated with prostitution, such as soliciting, procuring, living on the proceeds of prostitution (pimping), exploitation of prostitutes, under-age prostitution, and keeping a brothel. However, devolution provided the opportunity for separate legislation in Northern Ireland.

Nature and extent 
As elsewhere, accurate figures for the extent of prostitution in Northern Ireland are difficult to ascertain, given the covert nature of the activities, although the police estimated 40–100 people were working in the sex trade in 2010. As in other countries, street prostitution has declined in favour of off-street prostitution. As with much of Europe, there appears to be a fair amount of mobility of prostitutes in and out of the territory, particularly in Belfast. While exact numbers are very hard to obtain, the 2014 research suggested between 300 and 350 people working on any particular day, the majority of whom were women, with the commonest age range being 25–30. The researchers found that under-age prostitutes were uncommon, and that most prostitutes did not start till they were of legal age.

Research 
Despite the publicity given to the issue, there has been a paucity of research on prostitution in Northern Ireland. The Department of Justice carried out its own research published in 2011, and in 2013, it commissioned a research study, which was carried out by the Queen's University Belfast, and released in October 2014 (Research into Prostitution in Northern Ireland). The findings were dismissed by supporters of the Human Trafficking Bill, in particular Women's Aid and the DUP.

Current laws 
The legal framework is governed by Part 5 (Ss. 58–64) of the Sexual Offences (Northern Ireland) Order 2008 (S.I. 2008/1769 (N.I. 2)), as amended by the Policing and Crime Act 2009 (on 1 April 2010). These create offences for loitering or soliciting in a street or public place for the purposes of prostitution (S. 59), soliciting from a motor vehicle (kerb crawling) (S. 60), organising, advertising, or recruiting into prostitution for the purposes of gain (S. 62), controlling a prostitute (S. 63), or keeping a brothel (defined as more than one person selling sexual services in a given location) (S. 64).

Soliciting 
The Policing and Crime Act 2009 (S. 20) replaced Ss 60–61 of the Sexual Offences (Northern Ireland) Order 2008 dealing with soliciting by a new offence, S. 60 "Soliciting":

Exploitation 
The Policing and Crime Act 2009 (S. 15) created a new offence by amending the Sexual Offences (Northern Ireland) Order 2008 to include S. 64A "Paying for sexual services of a prostitute subjected to force etc.":

Purchasing sex 
Influenced by policies in Sweden, the Democratic Unionist Party Peer Maurice Morrow successfully campaigned for the criminalisation of purchasing sex in Northern Ireland. The Northern Ireland Assembly voted in Morrow's private members bill, Human Trafficking and Exploitation (Further Provisions and Support for Victims) Bill. On 1 June 2015 the resulting Human Trafficking and Exploitation (Criminal Justice and Support for Victims) Act (Northern Ireland) 2015 was introduced. While prostitution was only one element of the Act, the Act also stated that soliciting and loitering were no longer offences and that a programme of support would be offered to those exiting prostitution. Clients would be subject to a maximum penalty of one year in prison and a fine of £1000. 

Justice Minister, David Ford, who had earlier commissioned a study of the issue, expressed his opposition to clause 6, as did the police. The commissioned research was carried out by Queen's University Belfast. The Catholic Church supported the legislation, alongside the Irish Congress of Trade Unions, and many women's groups such as Women's Aid and Equality Now. Since it resembles legislation enacted in Sweden, a public debate on the merits of that law ensued, in addition to discussion as to what the state of affairs in Northern Ireland actually was. The DUP consistently backed the proposal to criminalise the purchase of sex in Northern Ireland. Despite initial scepticism, Sinn Féin, the Social Democratic and Labour Party, the Ulster Unionist Party, and the Traditional Unionist Voice all voted in favour of criminalisation. Only the Alliance Party, the Green Party, and NI21 opposed it. The Bill appeared to have public support, according to an October 2014 poll carried out by CARE.
Paying for sexual services of a person

6.—(1) The Sexual Offences (Northern Ireland) Order 2008 is amended as follows.

(2) For Article 64A (Paying for sexual services of a prostitute subjected to force etc.) substitute⁠—

“64A Paying for sexual services of a person

(1) A person (A) commits an offence if A obtains sexual services from a person (B) over the age of 18 in exchange for payment⁠—

(a) if the payment is made or promised by A; or

(b) if the payment is made or promised by a third party.

(2) Person A guilty of an offence under this article is liable⁠—

(a) on summary conviction to a fine not exceeding level 3 on the standard scale;

(b) to imprisonment for a term not exceeding one year or a fine not exceeding the statutory maximum, or both.

(3) In paragraph (1), "payment" means any financial advantage, including the discharge of an obligation to pay or the provision of goods or services (including sexual services) gratuitously or at a discount.

(4) For the avoidance of doubt, person B is not guilty of aiding, abetting or counselling the commission of an offence under this article.

(5) Within the first year of this offence coming into effect, the Department must raise awareness of this offence.

(6) The Department shall collect data to review the operation of this offence and report to the Assembly after this offence has been in effect for three years.".

The Bill passed First Reading in June 2013, and Second Reading on 24 September 2013. Submissions closed on 1 November 2013. The committee reported on 10 April 2014, with members divided on clause 6. The Justice Department continued to be opposed to clause 6. Amendments were anticipated and introduced in October 2014, with the final consideration debate on 20 October. The vote on clause 6 was 81:10 to approve it. 95% of the Human Trafficking and Exploitation Act 2015 came into effect on royal assent, but the criminalisation of the purchase of sex did not come into effect until 1 June 2015.

In September 2016, sex worker and law graduate Laura Lee brought a case to the Belfast High Court to re-evaluate the current prostitution laws in Northern Ireland, and to repeal Lord Morrow's law that made the purchase of sex illegal in 2015. The hearing had been granted for a judicial review, and the date was to be announced. Following the death of Laura Lee on 7 February 2017, the legal challenge was withdrawn.

Figures released by the Public Prosecution Service (PPS) in August 2016, showed that 10 men had been arrested under this legislation since it was introduced. Seven were referred to the PPS. Of those, no action was taken 3 cases, 2 men received cautions and the remaining two cases were being considered by a senior prosecutor. The first prosecution for paying for the services of a prostitute was on 27 October 2017 in Dungannon Magistrates Court. District Judge John Meehan was due to hear the case at a later date.

Organisations
Ugly Mugs Ireland is a not-for-profit technology initiative that aims to improve the safety of sex workers in Ireland and the UK and reduce crimes committed against them, by bringing sex workers together to share information about potential dangers.

See also 

History of Ireland
List of political parties in Northern Ireland
Northern Ireland Assembly
Parliament of Northern Ireland
Prostitution in the United Kingdom

References

Bibliography 
 Let's talk about sex work...in Northern Ireland. Helen McBride, Nursing Clio January 9 2014

External links 
 Northern Ireland Executive
 Department of Justice
 Northern Ireland Assembly 
 Human Trafficking and Exploitation (Further Provisions and Support for Victims) Bill. 26/11-15
 Human Trafficking and Exploitation (Further Provisions and Support for Victims) Bill: Committee stage and submissions
 Human Trafficking and Exploitation (Further Provisions and Support for Victims) Bill. Research and Information Service Paper. October 4 2013 507-13

Northern Ireland
Law of Northern Ireland
Criminal law of Northern Ireland
Culture of Northern Ireland
Society of Northern Ireland